Charon's Landing is an adventure novel by Jack Du Brul. It is the second book featuring the author's primary protagonist, Philip Mercer.

Plot introduction

Characters
Philip Mercer, geologist
Aggie Johnston, environmentalist

References

1999 American novels
Novels by Jack Du Brul